Olympe-Philippe Gerbet (5 February 1798 – 7 August 1864) was a French Catholic bishop and writer.

Biography
Gerbet was born at Poligny, Jura. He studied at the Académie and the Grand-Séminaire of Besançon, also at St-Sulpice and the Sorbonne. An admirer of Lamennais, he nevertheless accepted the papal encyclical Mirari vos of 15 August 1832, and the Singulari nos of 13 July 1834, which condemned the traditionalism of Lamennais. After fruitless efforts to convert the master, he withdrew to the Collège de Juilly (1836).

The years 1839-49 he spent in Rome, gathering data for his Esquisse de Rome Chrétienne. Recalled by Monseigneur Sibour, he became successively professor of sacred eloquence at the Sorbonne, Vicar-General of Amiens, and bishop of Perpignan (1854). His episcopate was marked by the holding of a synod (1865), the reorganization of clerical studies, various religious foundations, and by the pastoral instruction of 1860 sur diverses erreurs du temps présent, which served as a model for the Syllabus of Pope Pius IX.  He died at Perpignan, Pyrénées Orientales, aged 66.

Works
In the two former books Gerbet views the dogmas of the Eucharist and Penance as admirably fitted to develop the affections — nourrir le coeur de sentiments — just as he uses the réalités visibles of Rome as symbols of her essence spirituelle. Sainte-Beuve (Causeries de lundi, VI, 316) says that certain passages of Gerbet's writings "are among the most beautiful and suave pages that ever honoured religious literature". Gerbet's Mandements et instructions pastorales were published at Paris in 1876.

References

Further reading

External links

 

1798 births
1864 deaths
19th-century French writers
Bishops of Perpignan
French religious writers
People from Jura (department)
University of Paris alumni
Lycée Henri-IV alumni
French male non-fiction writers
19th-century French male writers
Liberal Catholicism